Shaza Fatima Khawaja is a Pakistani politician who is currently serving as Special Assistant to Prime Minister on Youth Affairs with the status of Minister of State. She is also member of National Assembly of Pakistan for the second consecutive term. She has been a member of the National Assembly of Pakistan, since August 2018. Previously she was a member of the National Assembly from June 2013 to May 2018.

Education and early career
She has completed her BSc Hons in Economics and Politics from Lahore University of Management Sciences and received her master's degree in International Relations from University of Warwick. In her early career, she served as faculty member for 6 years in International Relations and Political Science Department at LUMS (one of the leading universities of Pakistan).

Political career and contribution

As a candidate of Pakistan Muslim League (N) (PML-N) she was elected to the National Assembly of Pakistan on a reserved seat for women from Punjab in 2013 Pakistani general election.She was re-elected to the National Assembly as a candidate of PML-N on a reserved seat for women from Punjab in 2018 Pakistani general election.

She has offered commendable services to the National Assembly of Pakistan as Parliamentary Secretary, Ministry of Trade, Commerce and Textile. She has also served as Chief Coordinator for Prime Minister's Skills Development Program (heading nationwide arrangement to provide skills to youth in diverse disciplines based on the national and international employment demand), Convener for Pakistan-Azerbaijan Parliamentary Friendship Group; General Secretary, Young Parliamentarians Forum; Member Board of Governors at Federal Board of Intermediate and Secondary Studies Islamabad and as chairperson and member of various committees.

She has also represented Pakistan at a number of international platforms in various capacities mainly World Economic Forum, Switzerland; World Political Parties Dialogue, China; Youth Parliamentarians Forum, Netherlands; Pakistan Legislators Dialogue Forum, USA and many others.

Her interests include social policy, international relations/politics, education policy/projects including skills and vocational training and all issues pertaining to the youth of Pakistan.

References

Living people
Pakistani MNAs 2013–2018
Pakistani MNAs 2018–2023
Pakistan Muslim League (N) MNAs
Women members of the National Assembly of Pakistan
Year of birth missing (living people)
Academic staff of Lahore University of Management Sciences
Lahore University of Management Sciences alumni
Alumni of the University of Warwick
21st-century Pakistani women politicians